The Bialik Prize is an annual literary award given by the municipality of Tel Aviv, Israel, for significant accomplishments in Hebrew literature. The prize is named in memory of Israel's national poet Hayyim Nahman Bialik. There are two separate prizes, one specifically for "Literature", which is in the field of fiction, and the other for "Jewish thought" (חכמת ישראל). The prize was established in January 1933, Bialik's 60th birthday.

List of recipients

List of recipients in alphabetical order

References

External links
List of recipients 1933-2008, Tel Aviv Municipality website (Hebrew)
Bialik Prize rules- Tel Aviv Municipality website (Hebrew)

Israeli literary awards
Hebrew literary awards
Jewish literary awards
Fiction awards
Non-fiction literary awards
Lists of Israeli award winners
Awards by the municipality of Tel Aviv-Yafo
Awards established in 1933
1933 establishments in Mandatory Palestine